Gustav Kristiansen (31 March 1904 – 2 August 1988) was a Norwegian cyclist. He competed in the individual road race event at the 1928 Summer Olympics.

References

External links
 

1904 births
1988 deaths
Norwegian male cyclists
Olympic cyclists of Norway
Cyclists at the 1928 Summer Olympics
Cyclists from Oslo